Tanzid Hasan (born 1 December 2000) is a Bangladeshi cricketer. He made his Twenty20 debut for Uttara Sporting Club in the 2018–19 Dhaka Premier Division Twenty20 Cricket League on 26 February 2019. He made his List A debut for Uttara Sporting Club in the 2018–19 Dhaka Premier Division Cricket League on 8 March 2019. In December 2019, he was named in Bangladesh's squad for the 2020 Under-19 Cricket World Cup.

He made his first-class debut on 22 February 2020, for East Zone, in the final of the 2019–20 Bangladesh Cricket League. In February 2021, he was selected in the Bangladesh Emerging squad for their home series against the Ireland Wolves.

References

External links
 

1999 births
Living people
Bangladeshi cricketers
Bangladesh East Zone cricketers
Uttara Sporting Club cricketers
People from Bogra District